Souveyrols lake is a lake in Lozère, France on the Aubrac plateau. It has a glacial origin. Its surface area is 0.016 km². On his banks, grows the spectacular plant named  Ligularia sibirica. This boreal species is usually present in Russia and Siberia and is very rare in Western Europe.

Souveyrols